Tongue posture  is the resting position of tongue in the mouth. Improper tongue posture is when the person rests their tongue on the floor of mouth. In contrast, ideal tongue posture is when the person rests their tongue on the roof of mouth.

Effects of improper tongue posture
Improper tongue posture may cause speech impediments, snoring and sleep apnea, tooth grinding, tongue thrust and mouth breathing. Further complications from mouth breathing may cause halitosis, sleep disorders and symptoms that are somewhat identical to attention deficit hyperactivity disorder.

See also
Spinal posture

References

Habits
Posture
Tongue